1992–93 Croatian First A League was the second season of First A League. It was the second season of Croatian handball to be played after their departure from the Yugoslav First League. The tournament was won by title holders Badel 1862 Zagreb.

First phase

League 12

Second phase

Championship play-offs

Placement play-offs 
Matches played by teams ranked from 3 to 8 place in the League 12 table.

Relegation play-offs 
Matches played by teams ranked from 9 to 12 place in the League 12 table.

The table also includes matches from the first section of the competition.

Final standings

Sources
 Fredi Kramer, Dražen Pinević: Hrvatski rukomet = Croatian handball, Zagreb, 2009.; page 178
 Petar Orgulić: 50 godina rukometa u Rijeci, Rijeka, 2004.; pages 222, 223 and 224
 Kruno Sabolić: Hrvatski športski almanah 1992/1993, Zagreb, 1992.

References

External links
Croatian Handball Federation
Croatian Handball Portal

1992-93
handball
handball
1992–93 domestic handball leagues